SideScrollers is a graphic novel by Matthew Loux,  published by Oni Press.

Plot 
Brian, Brad and Matt are good guys with no direction and zero motivation. They play video games, eat junk food and kick around town without a care in the world. But their serene laziness disappears when Matt's crush, Amber, announces her intention to accompany Matt's nemesis, Richard the jock, to the big rock show. Determined to steer her away from the jerk, the boys must overcome an irate football team, a vengeful troop of Girly Scouts and a seriously evil cat, in a giant rock 'n' roll videogame adventure!

Reviews 
The comic was named one of YALSA's 2008 top ten graphic novels.

References

External links
 OniPress Page

Oni Press graphic novels